The men's 10,000 metres event at the 2007 European Athletics U23 Championships was held in Debrecen, Hungary, at Gyulai István Atlétikai Stadion on 14 July.

Medalists

Results

Final
14 July

Participation
According to an unofficial count, 24 athletes from 16 countries participated in the event.

 (1)
 (1)
 (2)
 (2)
 (1)
 (1)
 (1)
 (1)
 (1)
 (3)
 (2)
 (2)
 (1)
 (1)
 (1)
 (3)

References

10000 metres
10,000 metres at the European Athletics U23 Championships